"Hitchin' a Ride" is a song by American rock band Green Day. It was released in August 1997 as the first single from their fifth album, Nimrod, and is the second track on the album. The single reached number five on the US Billboard Modern Rock Tracks chart, number nine on the Billboard Mainstream Rock chart, and number 25 on the UK Singles Chart.

The song was later featured as the fourteenth track on their International Superhits! (2001) and as the eighth track off of God's Favorite Band (2017).

Reception
PopMatters listed "Hitchin' a Ride" as the sixth best Green Day song, citing "Suiting its falling-off-the-wagon subject matter, "Hitchin’ a Ride" is a hellish yet exhilarating track that makes picking up a bottle look like probably not wisest idea one could have."

Music video
The music video for "Hitchin' a Ride" was directed by Mark Kohr, the director that Green Day had favored throughout the Dookie and Insomniac singles. Coherently with the subject of the song, the music video shows the band performing in a scenery reminiscent of prohibition era, amongst suggestive characters in costumes.

"Hitchin' a Ride" can also be found on International Superhits!, Bullet in a Bible and Greatest Hits: God's Favorite Band. The music video is included on International Supervideos!.

Track listings
"Hitchin' a Ride"
"Sick of Me" (non-LP track)
"Espionage" (non-LP track)

LP box set

A-side:
 "Hitchin' a Ride"
 "Good Riddance (Time of Your Life)"
B-side:
 "Scattered"
 "Uptight"

Charts

Release history

See also
 List of RPM Rock/Alternative number-one singles (Canada)

References

1997 singles
1997 songs
American rock-and-roll songs
Green Day songs
Grunge songs
Rockabilly songs
Songs about alcohol